The Tunisia women's national junior handball team is the Tunisia women's national under-19 handball team, nicknamed Les Aigles de Carthage (The Eagles of Carthage or The Carthage Eagles), that represent Tunisia in the international handball competitions and it is Controlled by the Tunisian Handball Federation

Tournament record

World Championship
 Champions   Runners up   Third place   Fourth place

Red border color indicates tournament was held on home soil.

African Championship

Current squad
Squad for the 2019 African Women's Junior Handball Championship
Head coach: Moez Ben Amor

See also
Tunisia women's national handball team
Tunisia women's national youth handball team
Tunisia men's national junior handball team

References

External links
Official website 

Handball in Tunisia
Women's national junior handball teams
H